Atif Rauf (born March 3, 1964) is a former Pakistani cricketer who played in one Test against New Zealand in 1994. A right-handed batsman and occasional off spin bowler, he scored 16 and 9 in his only appearance.

He is a cousin of Pakistani cricketers Wasim Raja, Rameez Raja and Zaeem Raja.

References

1964 births
Living people
Pakistan Test cricketers
Zarai Taraqiati Bank Limited cricketers
Pakistani cricketers
Lahore City cricketers
Islamabad cricketers
Cricketers from Lahore